Sibilia is a municipality in the Quetzaltenango department of Guatemala. Sibilia derives from the Spanish town/word Seville or in the Spanish tongue Sevilla. However, the writer José Luís García A. related that this town founded by Spaniards had been designated as Seville. But, due to a variation in pronunciation, this name became popularly known as Sibilia, since 1887. Predominantly a town of Ladino people with very few indigenous people from Guatemala.

Sibilia is divided by 1 Town, 4 villages, 19 Hamlets, and 2 districts.
The four villages are: Chuicabal, El Rincón, La Unión y Piedra Grande.

The 19 Hamlets are:
Colonia Chiquita, Monte Bello, El Barreal, los Ángeles, Los Pocitos, La Laguna, Pacaché, Rachimaché, El Pais, Buena Vista, Las brisas, El Paraiso, Vista Hermosa, Vegas de Nazareth, La Selva, Nuevo Belén, San Luis, Patzacán y Lomas de en medio.

The 2 Districts are: La Libertad & El Progreso.

This town is arguably considered one the highest town of the Department of Quetzaltenango, there are many people who choose to leave this small, but charming town due to the living conditions and the route to go up to this amazing little town.

It has a population of approximately 1180.
Many have chosen to move to the nearest city which is Quetzaltenango or migrate to the United States of America. Generally speaking this town has a fluctuating population many of the people who are born here typically end up in bigger cities as mentioned before they migrate to big cities for example La Esperanza, Quetzaltenango, Quetzaltenango, Quetzaltenango, or the Nations Capital Guatemala City, Although many choose to migrate to the United States of America in States where they already have family a majority going to states like Virginia, California and Oklahoma.

References 

Municipalities of the Quetzaltenango Department